Nicholas County is a county located in the central region of U.S. state of West Virginia. As of the 2020 census, the population was 24,604. Its county seat is Summersville. The county was created in 1818 by the Virginia General Assembly and named for Virginia Governor Wilson Cary Nicholas.

Geography

In 1863, West Virginia's counties were divided into civil townships, with the intention of encouraging local government.  This proved impractical in the heavily rural state, and in 1872 the townships were converted into magisterial districts.  Nicholas County was divided into six districts: Grant, Jefferson, Kentucky, Mumble-the-peg, Summersville, and Wilderness.  In 1873, Mumble-the-peg became Hamilton District.  A seventh district, Beaver, was created in the 1880s.

Major highways
 U.S. Highway 19
 West Virginia Route 20
 West Virginia Route 39
 West Virginia Route 41
 West Virginia Route 55

Battlefields
Carnifex Ferry Battlefield,
Keslers Cross Lanes

Adjacent counties
Braxton County (north)
Webster County (northeast)
Greenbrier County (southeast)
Fayette County (southwest)
Clay County (northwest)
Kanawha County (west)

National protected areas
 Gauley River National Recreation Area (part)
 Monongahela National Forest (part)

Demographics

2000 census
As of the census of 2000, there were 26,562 people, 10,722 households, and 7,762 families living in the county.  The population density was 41 people per square mile (16/km2).  There were 12,406 housing units at an average density of 19 per square mile (7/km2).  The racial makeup of the county was 98.84% White, 0.05% Black or African American, 0.24% Native American, 0.19% Asian, 0.02% Pacific Islander, 0.10% from other races, and 0.55% from two or more races.  0.48% of the population were Hispanic or Latino of any race.

There were 10,722 households, out of which 30.70% had children under the age of 18 living with them, 58.70% were married couples living together, 10.00% had a female householder with no husband present, and 27.60% were non-families. 24.80% of all households were made up of individuals, and 11.80% had someone living alone who was 65 years of age or older.  The average household size was 2.46 and the average family size was 2.91.

In the county, the population was spread out, with 23.30% under the age of 18, 8.10% from 18 to 24, 27.60% from 25 to 44, 26.00% from 45 to 64, and 15.00% who were 65 years of age or older.  The median age was 39 years. For every 100 females there were 95.60 males.  For every 100 females age 18 and over, there were 92.20 males.

The median income for a household in the county was $26,974, and the median income for a family was $32,074. Males had a median income of $30,508 versus $17,964 for females. The per capita income for the county was $15,207.  About 15.00% of families and 19.20% of the population were below the poverty line, including 25.40% of those under age 18 and 13.80% of those age 65 or over.

2010 census
As of the 2010 United States census, there were 26,233 people, 10,938 households, and 7,591 families living in the county. The racial makeup of the county was 98.4% white, 0.3% Asian, 0.2% American Indian, 0.2% black or African American, 0.1% from other races, and 0.9% from two or more races. Those of Hispanic or Latino origin made up 0.6% of the population. In terms of ancestry, 21.7% were Irish, 19.0% were German, 12.9% were English, and 10.1% were American.

Of the 10,938 households, 28.8% had children under the age of 18 living with them, 53.8% were married couples living together, 10.7% had a female householder with no husband present, 30.6% were non-families, and 26.5% of all households were made up of individuals. The average household size was 2.38 and the average family size was 2.85. The median age was 43.3 years.

The median income for a household in the county was $38,457 and the median income for a family was $45,127. Males had a median income of $42,302 versus $25,859 for females. The per capita income for the county was $19,359. About 14.3% of families and 18.7% of the population were below the poverty line, including 25.5% of those under age 18 and 12.3% of those age 65 or over.

Politics

Elected officials

Communities

Cities
Richwood
Summersville (county seat)

Magisterial districts
Beaver
Grant
Hamilton
Jefferson
Kentucky
Summersville
Wilderness

Census-designated places
Belva
Birch River
Craigsville
Dixie
Fenwick
Nettie
Tioga

Unincorporated communities
Bentree
Calvin
Cambria
Canvas
Cottle
Drennen
Enon
Gilboa
Holcomb
Hookersville
Kesslers Cross Lanes
Leivasy
Lockwood
Mount Nebo
Mount Lookout, West Virginia
Muddlety 
New Hope
Odell Town
Persinger
Pool
Swiss
Werth
Zela

See also
 Carnifex Ferry Battlefield State Park
National Register of Historic Places listings in Nicholas County, West Virginia
Nicholas County Schools

References

Further reading
 William Griffee Brown, History of Nicholas County West Virginia. Richmond, VA: Dietz Press, 1954.
 A.J. Legg, A History of Panther Mountain Community (Nicholas County, West Virginia). Morgantown, WV: Agricultural Extension Division, 1930.
 Nicholas County Historical and Genealogical Society, Nicholas County History. Summersville, WV: Nicholas County Historical and Genealogical Society, 1985.
 Nicholas County Historical and Genealogical Society, Nicholas County, West Virginia, History 1985 Book Index. Summersville, WV: Nicholas County Historical and Genealogical Society, 1992.
 Nicholas County, e-WV: The West Virginia Encyclopedia. Charleston: West Virginia Humanities Council, 2012.

 
1818 establishments in Virginia
Populated places established in 1818
Counties of Appalachia